Meleonoma stomota is a moth in the family Cosmopterigidae. It is found in India and Sri Lanka.

References

Natural History Museum Lepidoptera generic names catalog

Cosmopterigidae